The Acura ARX-05 is a sports prototype racing car built to Daytona Prototype International regulations. It was developed in partnership by Honda Performance Development and Oreca, and is based on the Oreca 07 chassis and powered by the Acura AR35TT twin-turbocharged 3.5L V6 engine.

The car made its racing debut at the 2018 24 Hours of Daytona with Team Penske. In 2019, the car won the drivers', teams' and manufacturers' titles in the top DPi class of the IMSA WeatherTech SportsCar Championship, becoming the first non-General Motors car to do so. Acura and Team Penske successfully defended their titles in 2020, winning all of the DPi class championships.

It was announced in July 2020 that the partnership between Team Penske and Honda Performance Development would not be renewed for the 2021 season. For the 2021 season, Wayne Taylor Racing and Meyer Shank Racing campaigned one of the ARX-05s previously run by Penske. Both teams continued using the model for the 2022 season.

Complete IMSA SportsCar Championship results 
Results in bold indicate pole position. Results in italics indicate fastest lap.

References

External links 

Sports prototypes
Acura vehicles